City and Suburban Industrial is a suburb of Johannesburg, South Africa. It is located in Region 8.

Johannesburg Region F